Major-General Peter Frederick Everson OBE (born 1957) is a former British Army officer who commanded 4th Division.

Military career
Everson was commissioned into the Intelligence Corps in 1976. As a lieutenant-colonel he undertook a tour in Northern Ireland in 1997 during the Troubles for which he was awarded the OBE. As a colonel he was the chief intelligence officer for the Allied Rapid Reaction Corps in the Kosovo War. Promoted to brigadier, he was made Director of the Intelligence Corps and head of the Defence Intelligence and Security Centre in 2002. He was appointed the Deputy Commanding General of the Multi-National Corps – Iraq from February to September 2006 and then became General Officer Commanding 4th Division. He retired in 2008.

In retirement he became Head of Group Security at British American Tobacco.

References

|-

1957 births
Living people
British Army major generals
British Army personnel of the Iraq War
Intelligence Corps officers
Officers of the Order of the British Empire
British military personnel of The Troubles (Northern Ireland)